Symphyotrichum subspicatum (formerly Aster subspicatus) is a species of flowering plant in the family Asteraceae native to western North America. Its flowers have violet ray florets and yellow then reddish disk florets.

Citations

References

subspicatum
Flora of Alaska
Flora of Western Canada
Flora of the Northwestern United States
Flora of California
Plants described in 1832
Taxa named by Christian Gottfried Daniel Nees von Esenbeck